MovieWeb is an entertainment news website and video brand.

Overview
MovieWeb reports on entertainment news through their long-running website and related social media and video platforms. The site also maintains a searchable database of films.

History
MovieWeb first launched in 1995; by 1997 it was reported to be in operation supported by a 4-person team publishing movie information that, while not 'slick', had a 'certain charm'. In 2012 MovieWeb produced a video which was an 80s themed parody mashup of the Walking Dead series accompanied my music from Growing Pains that went viral.

Previously, MovieWeb was owned by WatchR Media, Inc., a privately held Las Vegas company.  In 2021 it was estimated the Movieweb website had 8 million unique visits for the month of July.  Movieweb has been owned and operated by online publisher Valnet Inc since September 2021 upon completion of the acquisition from WatchR.

Partnerships
In August 2000, MovieWeb announced a collaboration with video rental chain Video Update and video retail software provider Unique Business Systems Inc.

MovieWeb acts as a distribution partner of Hulu. MovieWeb also produces video content for IMDb.com.

References

External links
 

American film websites
Internet properties established in 1995